Twilight Cinema is the third studio album of the Norwegian band Major Parkinson.  It was released on January 24, 2014.  Major Parkinson launched an Indiegogo campaign to fund this album.

Track listing
 "Skeleton Sangria"
 "Impermanence"
 "Black River"
 "The Wheelbarrow"
 "A Cabin in the Sky"
 "Heart Machine"
 "Beaks of Benelova"
 "Twilight Cinema"

References 

2014 albums
Major Parkinson albums